Chet Baker Plays the Best of Lerner and Loewe is an album by trumpeter Chet Baker featuring show tunes by Lerner and Loewe which was recorded in 1959 and released on the Riverside label.

Reception

Allmusic awarded the album with 3 stars stating "these readings are comparatively understated. That said, the timelessness of the melodies, coupled with the assembled backing aggregate, make Chet Baker Plays the Best of Lerner and Loewe (1959) a memorable concept album".

Track listing
All compositions by Alan Jay Lerner and Frederick Loewe
 "I've Grown Accustomed to Her Face" - 4:16
 "I Could Have Danced All Night" - 3:43
 "The Heather on the Hill" - 5:04
 "On the Street Where You Live" - 8:37
 "Almost Like Being in Love" - 4:53
 "Thank Heaven for Little Girls" - 4:35
 "I Talk to the Trees" - 5:51
 "Show Me" - 6:30  
Recorded at Reeves Sound Studios in New York City on July 21 (tracks 2 & 6-8) and July 22 (tracks 1 & 3-5), 1959.

Personnel
Chet Baker - trumpet
Herbie Mann - flute, tenor saxophone
Zoot Sims - tenor saxophone, alto saxophone
Pepper Adams - baritone saxophone
Bob Corwin (tracks 1 & 3-5), Bill Evans (tracks 2 & 6-8) - piano
Earl May - bass
Clifford Jarvis - drums

References 

1959 albums
Chet Baker albums
Riverside Records albums
Albums produced by Orrin Keepnews